They Have a Motherland is a 1949 Soviet drama film directed by Aleksandr Faintsimmer and Vladimir Legoshin.

Plot 
The film tells about the representatives of Soviet intelligence, who are trying to find in West Germany an orphanage with Soviet children, which is under the supervision of British intelligence.

Starring 
 Natasha Zashchipina as Ira Sokolova
 Lyonya Kotov as Sasha Butuzov
 Pavel Kadochnikov as lieutenant colonel Aleksey Petrovich Dobrynin
 Vera Maretskaya as Sasha's mother
 Vsevolod Sanayev as major Vsevolod Vasilyevich Sorokin
 Lidiya Smirnova as orphanage teacher Smayda
 Gennady Yudin as chauffeur Kurt
 Faina Ranevskaya as café owner frau Vurst
 Vladimir Solovyov as Upmanis
Mikhail Astangov as orphanage chief captain Robert Scott
Viktor Stanitsyn as colonel Barkley
Aleksandr Khokhlov as Cook
Vergily Renin as captain Johnson
Yudif Glizer as journalist Dodge

References

External links 
 

1949 drama films
1949 films
Films scored by Aram Khachaturian
1940s Russian-language films
Soviet black-and-white films
Soviet drama films